In renal physiology, net acid excretion (NAE) is the net amount of acid excreted in the urine per unit time. Its value depends on urine flow rate, urine acid concentration, and the concentration of bicarbonate in the urine (the loss of bicarbonate, a buffering agent, is physiologically equivalent to a gain in acid). NAE is commonly expressed in units of milliliters per minute (ml/min) and is given by the following equation:

where

Pathology

Increased net acid excretion is a compensation for respiratory acidosis, while decreased net acid excretion is a compensation for respiratory alkalosis.

References

Renal physiology